Stella da Graça Pinto Novo Zeca is a politician in Mozambique.

Stella da Graça Pinto Novo Zeca became the governor of Gaza Province in 2015.

Filipe Nyusi appointed Stella da Graça Pinto Novo Zeca the provincial secretary for Sofala Province in 2020.

References

Mozambican politicians
Living people
Year of birth missing (living people)
Place of birth missing (living people)